James Horman (9 November 1877 – 20 May 1960) was an  Australian rules footballer who played with Geelong in the Victorian Football League (VFL).

Family
The son of William Robert Horman (1850-1921), and Hannah Horman (1847-1921), née Cameron, James Horman was born in Geelong on 9 November 1877.

His younger brother, George Horman (1883—1952), also played for both Chiwell and Geelong.

He married Minnie Maria Brame (1870-1909) in 1902. They had two sons: Hector Cyril Horman (1903-), and Roy Victor Horman (1907-1968).

Football

Geelong (VFL)
Having made his debut, against Carlton, at Princes Park, on 5 May 1900, he played in all of the fourteen home-and-away matches, and in the first of the three round-robin finals in 1900; and, again, in 1901, he played in all of the fourteen home-and-away matches, and in the first of the three round-robin finals.

His thirty-first (and last) game for the Geelong First XVIII was against Carlton, at Princes Park, on 3 May 1902.

Ballarat (BFA)
Horman was cleared from Geelong to the Ballarat Football Club in the Ballarat Football Association (BFA) in May 1902.

Chilwell (GDFA)
In 1903, Horman was playing for the Chilwell Football Club in the Geelong District Football Association (GDFA). He was one of Chilwell's best players in the team that won the 1903 Grand Final.<ref>[ Junior Football, The Geelong Advertiser', (Monday, 17 August 1903), p.3.]</ref>

Death
He died in Geelong on 20 May 1960.

 Notes 

References
 Holmesby, Russell & Main, Jim (2014), The Encyclopedia of AFL Footballers: every AFL/VFL player since 1897 (10th ed.)'', Seaford, Victoria: BAS Publishing. .

External links 

1877 births
1960 deaths
Australian rules footballers from Victoria (Australia)
Geelong Football Club players
Barwon Football Club players